Nova Crnja is a village and municipality located in the Central Banat District of the autonomous province of Vojvodina, Serbia. The village has a population of 1,491, while the municipality has 10,272 inhabitants.

Inhabited places

Nova Crnja municipality includes the following villages:
Nova Crnja
 Aleksandrovo 
 Vojvoda Stepa 
Radojevo
 Srpska Crnja 
 Toba (Hungarian: Tóba) 

Although the village of Nova Crnja is a seat of municipality, the largest of these villages is Srpska Crnja.

Before 1961, there was one more village in the municipality, which was abandoned because of groundwater. The name of the village was Molin.

Demographics

According to the 2011 census, the population of the municipality of Novi Crnja was 10,272 inhabitants.

Ethnic groups
Municipality
The population of the Nova Crnja municipality is composed of:
Serbs (67.39%)
Hungarians (17.71%)
Romani (9.89%)
Others and undeclared (5.01%)

Places with Serb ethnic majority are: Aleksandrovo, Vojvoda Stepa, Radojevo, and Srpska Crnja, while places with Hungarian ethnic majority are: Nova Crnja (Hungarian: Magyarcsernye) and Toba (Hungarian: Tóba).

Village
The population of the Nova Crnja village is composed of:
Hungarians (84.58%)
Serbs (6.02%)
Others.

Twin cities
 Nagyszénás, Hungary
 Jimbolia, Romania

See also
Municipalities of Serbia
List of places in Serbia
List of cities, towns and villages in Vojvodina
Central Banat District

References

External links

 
Populated places in Serbian Banat
Municipalities and cities of Vojvodina
Central Banat District